The Tchaikovsky Piano Concerto No.1 was the first recording of Van Cliburn in 1958 for RCA Victor. It won Cliburn a Grammy award and was the first classical recording to go platinum, that is to sell more than a million copies. The RCA Victor Symphony Orchestra was conducted by Kiril Kondrashin who at Cliburn's request had been given permission to leave the Soviet Union.

References

1950s classical albums
Concertos by Pyotr Ilyich Tchaikovsky

1958 albums
United States National Recording Registry recordings
United States National Recording Registry albums